Pukara (Aymara and Quechua for fortress, Hispanicized spelling Pucara) is a mountain in the Moquegua Region in the Andes of Peru, about  high. It is located in the General Sánchez Cerro Province, Ubinas District. Pukara is situated northeast of the active volcano Ubinas and southwest of Wit'uni. The Para River flows along its western slopes.

See also 
 Salinas and Aguada Blanca National Reservation

References 

Mountains of Moquegua Region
Mountains of Peru